The Portsmouth and Ryde Joint Railway was a group of three railway lines in Southern England that were jointly owned and operated by the London and South Western Railway and the London, Brighton and South Coast Railway. The last-named section was isolated from the others, being on the Isle of Wight. The first section of line opened in 1847 and the last in 1885; the Southsea branch closed in 1914 but all of the other routes have since been electrified and remain open.

History
In August 1845, the B&CR was authorised to build an extension to Portsmouth. Shortly after opening to Chichester, the B&CR was absorbed by the newly created London, Brighton and South Coast Railway (LBSCR).

Although the line was jointly owned by the LSWR and LBSCR, its services were provided by the IWR from the outset and from 1 October 1888 also by the Ryde and Newport Railway (which later became part of the Isle of Wight Central Railway), until those companies were absorbed by the Southern Railway (SR).

Like the main line, this branch was worked jointly by the LSWR and LBSCR.

A large motive power depot was built at Fratton, in the angle between the main line and the Southsea branch. Construction commenced in 1889, and its main feature was a roundhouse-type locomotive shed containing a turntable of  diameter. The LSWR and the LBSCR shared the turntable and most of the facilities, but each railway had its own offices, coal stages and stalls radiating from the turntable. Among a total of 293 members of staff in 1926, there were 101 pairs of drivers and firemen. A breakdown crane was provided, and by nationalisation this was capable of lifting . LBSCR locomotives based at Fratton had the letter "F" painted on the platform angle just behind the front buffer beam; the LSWR did not use shed codes, and nor did the SR, but under British Railways, the code 71D was allotted in 1950, and by 1956 this was altered to 70F. In January 1947, 43 locomotives were allocated to Fratton, of which 23 were ex-LSWR, 18 were ex-LBSCR, and two were SR U class 2-6-0s.

The Southsea branch closed on 8 August 1914 as a temporary wartime expedient, but it was not reopened, and the track was removed in 1924. At the 1923 Grouping, the LSWR and LBSCR amalgamated with each other and with some other railways to create the Southern Railway, which thus became owners of the P&RJR. Apart from the Southsea branch, all of the lines of the P&RJR passed to British Railways at the start of 1948, and are still open.

Electrification
On 27 June 1935 the SR announced plans to electrify the route between Hampton Court Junction (near ) and Portsmouth via ; this included the portion of the former P&RJR between Portcreek Junction and Portsmouth Harbour station. Work commenced in October 1935, and was sufficiently complete to allow an electric train to reach Portsmouth & Southsea on 8 March 1937, and Portsmouth Harbour on 11 April. The full electric service began on 4 July 1937.

In 1988, British Rail obtained approval to electrify the route between Portsmouth and Southampton and between Fareham and Eastleigh, which included the remaining unelectrified portion of the former P&RJR between Portcreek Junction and Cosham and also the northern side of the Cosham triangle; the lines were energised on 14 March 1990 with services commencing on 14 May 1990.

Extent
At its peak, the P&RJR had  of route on the mainland, including the Southsea branch and two short branches in Portsmouth: one from Blackfriars Junction to the terminal (low level) portion of Portsmouth Town station; and one from just outside Portsmouth Harbour station to Watering Island Jetty.

Notes

References

British joint railway companies
London and South Western Railway
London, Brighton and South Coast Railway
Defunct railway companies of the United Kingdom
Railway companies established in 1847
1847 establishments in England
Rail transport in Hampshire
Rail transport on the Isle of Wight
History of Hampshire
History of the Isle of Wight